Cabera erythemaria, the yellow-dusted cream, is a species of geometrid moth in the family Geometridae. It is found in North America.

The MONA or Hodges number for Cabera erythemaria is 6677.

References

Further reading

 
 
 

Caberini
Moths described in 1858